Goodenia hirsuta is a species of flowering plant in the family Goodeniaceae and is endemic to northern Australia. It is a hairy, prostrate to low-lying perennial herb with narrow egg-shaped leaves at the base of the plant, racemes of hairy yellow flowers and oval to elliptic fruit.

Description

Taxonomy and naming
Goodenia hirsuta was first formally described in 1862 by Ferdinand von Mueller in Fragmenta Phytographiae Australiae.
The specific epithet (hirsuta) means "hairy, with long, shaggy hairs".

Distribution and habitat
This goodenia grows in a variety of soils in arid regions of Western Australia, north-eastern Northern Territory, South Australia and Queensland.

Conservation status
Goodenia hirsuta is classified as of "least concern" under the Northern Territory Government Territory Parks and Wildlife Conservation Act 1976 and the Queensland Government Nature Conservation Act 1992, but as "Priority Three" by the Government of Western Australia Department of Parks and Wildlife meaning that it is poorly known and known from only a few locations but is not under imminent threat.

References

hirsuta
Plants described in 1862
Taxa named by Ferdinand von Mueller
Flora of South Australia
Flora of Queensland
Flora of the Northern Territory
Eudicots of Western Australia
Flora of Victoria (Australia)